Laune Rangers is a Gaelic football and Hurling club based in town of Killorglin, County Kerry, Ireland.  The club is affiliated to Kerry GAA.  Rangers won the All-Ireland Senior Club Football Championship in 1996.

History
The club was formed in 1888 by two teachers. The newly formed club won the Kerry County Championship of 1889 and 1890. In 1890, after again winning the County Championship, Rangers represented Kerry in the All-Ireland series. They defeated Clondrohid 3-6 to 0-5 and won the Munster final but lost the All-Ireland Final.  The first recorded match the club played was against John Mitchels in 1888. The club's finest hour came when they won the All-Ireland Senior Club Football Championship in 1996 beating Éire Óg of Carlow in the final.

Famous players have included Mike & Liam Hassett, Peter Crowley and Mike Frank Russell, all of whom have won All-Ireland Senior Football Championship titles with the Kerry county team.

Important club dates

1888 - Club formed.
1889 - First Kerry Championship.
1909 - J.P O’Sullivan dies.
1913 - Paddy Kennelly was the first Killorglin man to win an All- Ireland Medal.
1928 - Killorglin Hurlers took their place in the County Hurling Championships for the first time.
1958 - First Mid Kerry Senior Football Championship title
1972 - First under-age County title at U-12.
1989 - First Kerry Minor Football Championship
1996 - Managed by John Evans, Laune Rangers win All-Ireland Final.

Notable players

 Peter Crowley 2014 All-Ireland Senior Football Championship and 2014 All-Star winner
 Timmy Fleming Former Kerry captain 
 Mike Hassett 1996–97 National Football League and 1997 Munster Senior Football Championship winning captain.
 Liam Hassett - 1997 All-Ireland Senior Football Championship winning captain
 Mike Frank Russell five time All-Ireland Senior Football Championship and 2000 All-Star winner.

Honours

Football
 All-Ireland Senior Club Football Championship (1): 1995–96
 Munster Senior Club Football Championship (2): 1995, 1996
 Kerry Senior Football Championship (12): 1887, 1888, 1889, 1890, 1892, 1893, 1900, 1911, 1989, 1993, 1995, 1996
 Kerry Club Football Championship (3): 1966, 1998, 1999
 Kerry Novice Football Championship (1): 1970
 Mid Kerry Senior Football Championship (28): 1958, 1963, 1966, 1967, 1969, 1970, 1973, 1983, 1984, 1985, 1986, 1987, 1988, 1990, 1991, 1992, 1993, 1994, 1995, 1996, 1997, 1999, 2000, 2002, 2003, 2004, 2005, 2006
 East Kerry Senior Football Championship (1): 1932
 Kerry County Football League – Division 1 (9): 1986, 1987, 1989, 1992, 1994, 1995, 1996, 1997, 1998
 Kerry Under 21 Football Championship (2): 1990, 1995
 Kerry Minor Football Championship (5): 1977, 1987, 1988, 1989, 1995

Ladies' Football
 Kerry Senior Ladies' Football Championship (1): 2013

Hurling
 Kerry Junior Hurling Championship: (1) 2003

County Championship winning captains
Football
 1887: 
 1888:
 1889: J.P. O'Sullivan
 1890: J.P. O'Sullivan
 1892: J.P. O'Sullivan
 1893: J.P. O'Sullivan
 1900: John. P. Murphy
 1911: Dan Hayes
 1989: Peter Lyons
 1993: James O'Shea
 1995: Gerard Murphy
 1996: Mark O'Connor

References

External links
Official Laune Rangers GAA Club website
Laune Rangers at the Irish Independent

Further reading
Trail Blazers - A Century of Laune Rangers, 1888 to 1988. by Pat O'Shea (291 pages, 26 chapters, hand bound in Muckross House, Killarney)

Gaelic games clubs in County Kerry
Gaelic football clubs in County Kerry
Hurling clubs in County Kerry